Floyd Archibald Naramore (July 21, 1879 in Warren, Illinois – October 29, 1970 in Seattle) was a Seattle architect.  He was Seattle Schools Architect from 1919 to 1932, and he was a founding partner, in 1943, of the firm that today is known as NBBJ.

Naramore studied engineering at the University of Wisconsin–Madison.  He subsequently took a job as a drafter with the Chicago and North Western Transportation Company (C&NWRR) from 1900 to 1903, then worked with architect George Fuller on a C&NWRR office building for two years.  He returned to school and earned an architectural degree at MIT in 1907.  After a brief stint in Chicago, Naramore moved to Portland, Oregon, where he worked for Northwest Bridgeworks from 1909 to 1912 as a cost estimator.

Naramore's involvement with schools began thereafter and lasted until the 1930s.  He was appointed Architect and Superintendent of properties for the Portland School District, a job he held from 1912 to 1919. He would design 16 schools in Portland, including Benson Polytechnic High School and Couch School. Many of the other schools in Portland built at the time were designed by George Jones.  In 1919 Naramore was hired by the Seattle School District as the district's architect.  Naramore became a prolific designer of schools contemporaneously with a new state compulsory attendance law and a decision to add junior high schools to the system which created tremendous demand for new buildings.  He was responsible for the design of over thirty schools for the district.  He also undertook school projects outside Seattle and consulted on school projects in other districts.

After 1931, Naramore practiced on his own designing institutional buildings;  for example, he was a co-designer with Grainger & Thomas, and Bebb & Gould on Bagley Hall (1935–36) at the University of Washington.  In 1939 Naramore took his long-time Associate Clifton Brady into partnership forming Naramore & Brady.

During the Second World War the firm participated in a variety of joint ventures to carry out design of defense projects.  In 1943, Naramore & Brady joined with William J. Bain and Perry Johanson to form Naramore, Bain, Brady and Johanson (nicknamed "the Combine").  The success of this collaboration led the partners to continue it after 1945.  Naramore remained senior partner until his death in 1970.  Today the successor firm is known as NBBJ.

Naramore was named a Fellow of the American Institute of Architects (AIA) in 1935, and served as president of the Washington State Chapter of the AIA (predecessor of today's AIA Seattle chapter) from 1939 to 1940.

References

Further reading 
 Dietz, Duane A. "Floyd A. Naramore" in Jeffrey Karl Ochsner, ed., Shaping Seattle Architecture: A Historical Guide to the Architects. Seattle and London: University of Washington Press, 1994, pages 198-203, 302;  
 Portrait, Architectural Forum, 95 (September 1951), p. 132.
 Portrait, Architectural Record, 93 (June 1943), p. 47.
 Portrait, Progressive Architecture, 28 (November 1947), p. 12.
 Portrait, Progressive Architecture, 31 (September 1950), p. 57.

External links

 HistoryLink essay on Floyd Naramore
 Seattle AIA College of Fellows
 Seattle AIA Presidents 1894 - 
 Docomomo WEWA - Floyd Naramore

1879 births
1970 deaths
Fellows of the American Institute of Architects
MIT School of Architecture and Planning alumni
Architects from Portland, Oregon
Architects from Seattle
 University of Wisconsin–Madison College of Engineering alumni